Henri-Joseph Rutxhiel (1775 in Lierneux, Belgium – 1837 in Paris, France) was a Belgian sculptor. He belonged to the neoclassicism movement.

He was first shepherd, then sculptor in his late life. In 1800, he became the pupil of Jean-Antoine Houdon, then that of sculptor Philippe-Laurent Roland and the painter Jacques-Louis David. In 1809, he won the Prix de Rome for sculpture with a relief Dédale attachant des ailes à son fils Icare and then went to the Villa Medici.

Main works
 Zéphyr enlevant Psyché 1814, group, marble, Paris, musée du Louvre
 Le Roi de Rome (1811), bust, marble, château de Chimay
 Portrait d'Elfriede Clarke de Feltre, bust, marble, Nantes, Musée des Beaux-Arts
 Buste du Duc de Berry (Duke of Berry) en costume militaire, bronze, Paris, musée du Louvre

References

1775 births
1837 deaths
19th-century French sculptors
French male sculptors
Prix de Rome for sculpture
Neoclassical sculptors
Pupils of Jacques-Louis David